Agassizia is a genus of sea urchin of the family Prenasteridae. The species was first scientifically described in 1869 by Achille Valenciennes.

References 

Schizasteridae
Echinoidea genera
Fossil taxa described in 1846